Zanjireh-ye Olya (also Romanized as Zanjīreh-ye ‘Olyā; also known as Zanjīreh) is a village in Zanjireh Rural District, in the Shabab District of Chardavol County, Ilam Province, Iran. At the 2006 census, its population was 2,519, in 532 families. It is the capital village of the Rural district which was established on June 30, 2013. The village is populated by Kurds.

References 

Populated places in Chardavol County
Kurdish settlements in Ilam Province